Kang Yi (born August 1966) is a Chinese banker and politician and the current director of the National Bureau of Statistics, in office since March 2022.

Biography
Kang was born in Shuangfeng County, Hunan, in August 1966 and graduated from Shanghai University of Finance and Economics. He joined the Chinese Communist Party (CCP) in July 1986.

Beginning in 1988, he served in several posts in China Construction Bank, including vice president of Hubei Branch, president of Gansu Branch, and president of Fujian Branch. In November 2016, he as promoted to become vice president of the Agricultural Bank of China, a position he held until 2018.

In January 2018, he was appointed vice mayor of Tianjin, he remained in that position until March 2022, when he was transferred to Beijing and appointed director of the National Bureau of Statistics.

References

1966 births
Living people
People from Shuangfeng County
Shanghai University of Finance and Economics alumni
Chinese bankers
People's Republic of China politicians from Hunan
Chinese Communist Party politicians from Hunan